Bruno Salomone (born 13 July 1970) is a French actor and comedian.

Theater

Dubbing 
He gave his voice to the following movies in their French versions.

Filmography

References

External links

 

French comedians
1970 births
People from Villeneuve-Saint-Georges
Living people
French people of Italian descent
French people of Sicilian descent
French humorists
21st-century French male actors
French male film actors
French male television actors
French male stage actors
French male voice actors